The Dutch Top 40 is a weekly music chart compiled by Stichting Nederlandse Top 40. It started as a radio program titled "Veronica Top 40", on the offshore station Radio Veronica in 1965. It remained "The Veronica Top 40" until 1974, when the station was forced to stop broadcasting. Joost den Draaijer initiated the Top 40 in the Netherlands. The show currently airs on Fridays from 2 to 6 PM on Qmusic.

History
On January 2, 1965, the first Top 40 was compiled, with its first #1 hit "I Feel Fine" by The Beatles. In September 1974, the Stichting Nederlandse Top 40 bought the Top 40 and named it De Nederlandse Top 40. The Dutch Top 40 is one of the four official charts in the Netherlands, the other three being the B2B Single Top 100, which is based entirely on pure sales and streaming, the Mega Top 30 from (NPO 3FM) which, like the Dutch Top 40 also includes airplay data and the 538 Top 50.

From October 4th. 1974 until May 20th. 1976, the Top 40 was broadcast by TROS on the pop radio station Hilversum 3, presented by Dutch famous DJ Ferry Maat. From May 28th, 1976 until November 29th. 1985 the Top 40 was broadcast by Veronica on Hilversum 3. As of December 1st. 1985, after the rename of the station name to Radio 3, the Top 40 continued to be broadcast by Veronica on Radio 3.

In January 1993 Radio 3 decided that the broadcasting of two hit lists (the other one was the Nationale Top 100) on one radio station must come to an end and therefore as from February 7th. 1993 Radio 3 started to broadcast a new hitlist: the Mega Top 50 and wanted to terminate the broadcasting of the Top 40. Due to a lawsuit of the Stichting Nederlandse Top 40, Veronica had to continue broadcasting the Dutch Top 40 on Radio 3 until December 18th. 1993.

Meanwhile the Dutch Top 40 was also broadcast on the Dutch commercial radiostation Radio 538 since June 1993. The list continued to be broadcast on this radiostation until December 28th. 2018, when Radio 538 discontinued the broadcasting of the Dutch Top 40. As from January 4th. 2019, the Top 40 is broadcast by the Dutch commercial radiostation Qmusic.

Compilation

Composition
For most of its history, the Top 40 was based on sales figures of record stores. These were collected through telephone surveys. As of 1999, the airplay of a limited number of radio stations was included. Between 2006 and 2014, download figures were added to the mix. They were removed again because supposedly, download sales could be easily manipulated by record companies or artists.

As of February 2014, the chart is a combination of airplay, streaming, and social media trends. The more often a song gets played on the radio, the higher its ranking in the Top 40. 

To compute year-end chart positions, the weekly #1 positions get 40 points, the #2 positions get 39 points, etc. These weekly scores are then added up and sorted by single to determine the ranking.

Tipparade
The Tipparade, a 'bubbling under' chart for the Top 40, is based on sales, streaming, airplay, and recommendations from both the general public and the music industry.

Rules

There is a set of rules, of which some have existed since 1972, that has been maintained up until 2012. Some of these have been criticized as a hindrance.
Since late 1971, singles had to remain at least two weeks in the charts. If a single officially no longer belongs in the Top 40, these are placed on #40.
Example: Missy Elliott's "Lose Control": Remained two weeks on #40 in the chart, because it did not sell enough and also wasn't played enough on the radio.
There have been two exceptions for this, though: In October 1994, Pet Shop Boys' "Yesterday, When I Was Mad" stayed in the charts for only one week due to an error in the compilation, and in late September 2007, Kus's "4 meiden" just didn't sell enough to stay in the charts for two weeks.
Since 1983, singles that move up in the chart by a large number of positions are assigned superstip ("super bullet") status. These singles were not allowed to fall down in chart position in the following week. If a superstip single had comparatively lower sales/airplay statistics a week later, it would remain stuck on the same chart position until the second week of drop, by which time it may appear as if it dropped hard in chart positions.
Example: Guus Meeuwis's "Ik wil dat ons land juicht": The song entered the chart at #11 (superstip), rose up to #5 (superstip again) in its second week. The following week it was meant to drop in chart position, but remained on the #5 position. The following two weeks, it went from #5 to #39. Because of this rule, this single was the biggest fall down in the Top 40. However, this was not always the case. Sometimes singles with a superstip status did drop, for example, if there's no room.
Up until 2005, there were no clear rules on when a single could re-enter the Top 40. Apparently, a song had to re-enter at least in the top 30 portions of the chart to be allowed back, which happened occasionally. In the case of re-issued singles, there were no rules whatsoever - these singles could re-enter anyway. Since the mid-2000s, new rules were implemented, meaning that only songs from recently deceased artists could return to the Top 40, such as Michael Jackson's Billie Jean after the artist's death in 2009. Since 2012, "normal" re-entries have started to occur again. During the Christmas season, however, re-entries of older Christmas classics (e.g. Wham!'s Last Christmas or Mariah Carey's All I Want for Christmas Is You) are barred from re-entering the Top 40, even though their streaming and airplay activity should earn them a Top 40 position.
Singles with double A-side are listed separately in the Top 40; due to the (possible) different amount of airplay the two songs get.
Example: Robbie Williams' first single off his 2005 album Intensive Care was "Tripping" with the B-side being "Make Me Pure". While "Tripping" topped the chart by peaking at #1, "Make Me Pure" peaked at #15 in the Top 40.

Records, milestones and achievements
This is a listing of significant achievements and milestones based upon the Dutch Top 40 charts.

Song achievements

Most weeks at number one
17 weeks
Harry Styles — "As It Was" (2022)

16 weeks
Calvin Harris with Dua Lipa — "One Kiss" (2018)

15 weeks
Ed Sheeran — "Shape of You" (2017)
Luis Fonsi & Daddy Yankee featuring Justin Bieber — "Despacito (Remix)" (2017)
Tones and I — "Dance Monkey" (2019-20)

14 weeks
The Weeknd — "Blinding Lights" (2020)

13 weeks
Gusttavo Lima — "Balada" (2012)

12 weeks
Marco Borsato — "Dromen Zijn Bedrog" (1994)
Shawn Mendes featuring Camila Cabello — "Señorita" (2019)

11 weeks
Bruno Mars — "Just the Way You Are" (2010)
Clean Bandit featuring Jess Glynne — "Rather Be" (2014)
André Hazes and Gerard Joling — "Blijf Bij Mij" (2007)
OMI — "Cheerleader" (Felix Jaehn remix) (2015)
Michel Teló — "Ai Se Eu Te Pego!" (2012)
Robin Thicke featuring T.I. & Pharrell Williams — "Blurred Lines" (2013)
Davina Michelle — "Duurt Te Lang" (2018-19)
Avicii — "Wake Me Up" (2013) 
Marco Borsato — "Rood" (2006)
Bryan Adams — "(Everything I Do) I Do It for You" (1991)

10 weeks
Owl City —  "Fireflies" (2009–10)
Céline Dion — "My Heart Will Go On" (1998)
BLØF featuring Geike Arnaert — "Zoutelande" (2018)
Vangelis — "Conquest of Paradise" (1995)
4 Non Blondes — "What's Up? (1993)
Mike Posner — "I Took a Pill in Ibiza (SeeB remix) (2016)
Alexis Jordan — "Happiness" (2011)
Snelle and Maan — "Blijven Slapen" (2021)
Heintje — "Ich Bau' Dir Ein Schloss" (1968)

Source:

Most total weeks in the Top 40

49 weeks
Pharrell Williams — "Happy" (2013–14)
42 weeks
Lewis Capaldi — "Someone You Loved" (2019)
41 weeks 
Corry En De Rekels — "Huilen Is Voor Jou Te Laat" (1970–71)
40 weeks
The Scorpions — "Hello Josephine" (1965, 1977)
Trio Hellenique — "Zorba's Dance" (1965–66, 1974)[1]
39 weeks
Jane Birkin and Serge Gainsbourg — "Je T'aime... Moi Non Plus" (1969, 1974)
38 weeks
Avicii — "Wake Me Up" (2013–14, 2018)
Gotye featuring Kimbra — "Somebody That I Used to Know" (2011–12)
35 weeks
Dave Berry — "This Strange Effect" (1965–66)
Nini Rosso — "Il Silenzio" (1965–66)[2]
34 weeks
The Weeknd — "Blinding Lights" (2019-2020)
De Heikrekels — "Waarom Heb Jij Me Laten Staan?" (1967)
John Legend — "All of Me" (2013–14)
33 weeks
Major Lazer and DJ Snake featuring MØ — "Lean On" (2015)
Five Seconds of Summer — "Youngblood" (2018-19)
Gers Pardoel — "Ik Neem Je Mee" (2011–12)
Henk Westbroek — "Zelfs Je Naam Is Mooi" (1998–99)
Joel Corry featuring MNEK — "Head & Heart" (2020)
Danny Vera — "Rollercoaster" (2019-20)
Nielson — "Beauty En De Brains" (2012–13)
Lorde — "Royals" (2013–2014)
Sam Smith — "Stay with Me" (2014–15)
Camila Cabello featuring Young Thug — "Havana (Camila Cabello song)" (2017-18)

Source:

Notes
1 ^Three different versions of the song (which was featured in the 1964 film Zorba the Greek), performed by Trio Hellenique, Mikis Theodorakis and Duo Acropolis, were combined as one chart entry (which happened more often in the 1960s), spending 37 weeks on the chart. The Trio Hellenique version spent three more weeks on the chart in 1974, totalling 40 weeks.
2 ^Different versions of the song were performed by three different artists, and were listed on the Top 40 as only one song.

Number-one debuts

The Beatles — "I Feel Fine" (January 2, 1965)
The Beatles — "We Can Work It Out" / "Day Tripper" (December 25, 1965)
Procol Harum — "A Whiter Shade of Pale" (June 17, 1967)
The Beatles — "Hey Jude" (September 14, 1968)
Jantje Smit — "Ik zing dit lied voor jou alleen" (April 12, 1997)
Elton John — "Something About the Way You Look Tonight" / "Candle in the Wind 1997" (September 27, 1997)
2Pac — "Changes" (February 13, 1999)
Backstreet Boys — "I Want It That Way" (May 8, 1999)
Starmaker — "Damn (I Think I Love You)" (April 14, 2001)
One Day Fly — "I Wanna Be a One Day Fly" (May 19, 2001)
Shaggy featuring Rayvon — "Angel" (June 23, 2001)
Shakira — "Whenever, Wherever" (February 9, 2002)
Jamai — "Step Right Up" (March 29, 2003)
Jim — "Tell Her" (May 17, 2003)
Dinand Woesthoff — "Dreamer (Gussie's song)" (February 21, 2004)
Boris — "When You Think of Me" (May 22, 2004)
Marco Borsato and Ali B — "Wat zou je doen" (September 25, 2004)
André Hazes — "Zij gelooft in mij" (October 9, 2004)
MEN2B — "Bigger Than That" (December 25, 2004)
Artiesten Voor Azië — "Als je iets kan doen" (January 15, 2005)
Kane — "Fearless" (August 6, 2005)
Ch!pz — "Carnival" (August 27, 2005)
Lange Frans & Baas B — "Het land van..." (October 8, 2005)
Andrea Bocelli and Marco Borsato — "Because We Believe" (February 11, 2006)
Raffaëla — "Right Here Right Now" (March 25, 2006)
Sharon Kips — "Heartbreak Away" (March 10, 2007)
Jan Smit — "Dan volg je haar benen" (November 3, 2007)
Nikki — "Hello World" (March 15, 2008)
Marco Borsato — "Wit licht" (May 3, 2008)
Marco Borsato — "Stop de tijd" (August 30, 2008)
Lisa — "Hallelujah" (May 23, 2009)
Lady Gaga — "Born This Way" (February 26, 2011)
Nick & Simon — "Julia" (March 23, 2013)
Adele — "Hello" (October 31, 2015)
Olivia Rodrigo — "Drivers License" (January 23, 2021)
Adele — "Easy on Me" (October 23, 2021)

Artist achievements

Most Top 40 entries

 BZN (55)
 Madonna (55)
 David Guetta (53)
 Michael Jackson (50)
 The Rolling Stones (49)
 Golden Earring (47)
 Queen (46)
 Normaal (46)
 U2 (44)
 Vader Abraham (43)
 Bee Gees (43)

Source:

Most number-one singles

Source:

Source:

Source:

References

External links
 Dutch Top 40 / Official website—contains archive from 1965 onwards  Is now fully renewed!
 Dutch Top 40 / Radio 538 website—contains archive from 1965 onwards

Dutch record charts